Tails Up! was a 1918 London revue presented by André Charlot starring Jack Buchanan. The premiere took place at the Comedy Theatre, London on 1 June 1918 with Philip Braham conducting the band, and the show ran for 467 performances.

Songs
The main credit for the music was to Philip Braham with lyrics by Davy Burnaby and Hugh E. Wright. The "Book" (or script) was by John Hastings Turner. Additional songs were provided by Doris Joel, Noël Coward, and others.
Songs in the revue included:
 "Wild thyme", words by Douglas Furber, music by Philip Braham.
 "The five thirty five to Brighton"
 "Apache rag"
 "Gnee-ah!"
 "The twinkle in my eye"
 "The curfew"
 "The servants' ball"
 "Peter Pan", words by Noël Coward, music by Doris Joel. This was Coward's first publicly performed song.
 "'N Everything," - the Al Jolson, B.G. DeSylva and Gus Kahn number.

"Peter Pan" was Coward's first lyric to be sold, though the accounts of Coward's audition with Charlot given by Coward and Charlot differ markedly.

Cast
 Jack Buchanan
 Phyllis Monkman
 Phyllis Titmuss
 Gilbert Childs
 Clifford Cobb
 Teddie Gerard
Babette Tobin

References

1918 musicals
Revues
West End musicals